The Akademik Shuleykin- class vessels are Finnish-built ice-strengthened ships built for the USSR. They were originally used for oceanographic research; currently several have been converted for tourism in Arctic/Antarctic waters, carrying approximately 50 passengers.

Ships in class 
 Akademik Shuleykin 1982 IMO: 8010324; renamed Polar Pioneer (now converted for tourism);
 Akademik Shokalskiy, 1982  IMO: 8010336 (1998 converted for tourism)
 Professor Molchanov, 1982 IMO: 8010348 (converted for tourism)
 Professor Khromov, 1983 IMO: 8010350; renamed Spirit of Enderby (now converted for tourism)
 Professor Multanovskiy, 1983 IMO: 8010362 (converted for tourism)
 Akademik Gamburtsye, 1983 IMO: 8118994; 1997 renamed Fregat; 2003 renamed Nordsyssel (used by the governor of Svalbard); 2014 renamed Polar Surveyor (survey ship for Gardline Marine Sciences); 2020 renamed Nansen Explorer and converted to polar expedition yacht for Nansen Polar Expeditions
 Arnold Veymer, 1984 IMO 8119027; 1991 renamed Livonia; transferred to Estonia as a patrol and pollution cleanup ship, sold to Sweden and converted again (now )
 Akademik Golitsyn, 1984 IMO: 8119003 (Академик Голицын)
 Professor Polshkov, 1984 IMO: 8119015 (scrapped 2013)
 Geolog Dmitriy Nalivkin, 1985 IMO: 8119039

References

Notes

See also 
 Тип Академик Шулейкин, проект 637 (Project 637 list)(Russian)

 
Tourism in Antarctica